Chrostosoma mediana is a moth of the subfamily Arctiinae. It was described by William Schaus in 1928. It is found in Paraguay.

References

External links
Biodiversity Heritage Library

Chrostosoma
Moths described in 1928